Titaguas is a village and municipality in the comarca of Los Serranos in the Valencian Community, Spain.

References

Municipalities in the Province of Valencia
Los Serranos